Tillandsia tricolor is a species of flowering plant in the genus Tillandsia. This species is native to Central America (Costa Rica, Panama, Guatemala, Nicaragua, Honduras) and Mexico (Veracruz, Oaxaca, Chiapas).

Cultivars
 Tillandsia 'Cootharaba'
 Tillandsia 'Corella'
 Tillandsia 'Ervin Wurthmann'
 Tillandsia 'Nashville'
 Tillandsia 'Oeseriana'
 Tillandsia 'Purple Passion'
 Tillandsia 'Silver Bullets'
 Tillandsia 'Wolvi'

References

tricolor
Flora of Central America
Flora of Mexico
Epiphytes
Plants described in 1831